First Shot is the only studio album by German pop-duo Some & Any, released by Warner Music on 18 December 2009 in German-speaking Europe, following the band's formation on German television casting-show Popstars Du & Ich. The album includes the band's debut single "Last Man Standing", songs performed by former contestants during the show, songs written by and featuring Michelle Leonard and songs produced by Alex Christensen.

Track listing
The album includes following songs.

References

External links
 Some & Any.de — official website

2009 debut albums
Warner Music Group albums